Scott Township is one of thirteen townships in Fremont County, Iowa, United States.  As of the 2010 census, its population was 486 and it contained 217 housing units.

Geography

Cities, towns, villages
 Bartlett
 Thurman

Cemeteries
The township contains Ewell Cemetery, Mackey Cemetery, Thurman Cemetery and Thurman Cemetery.

Transportation
 Interstate 29

Lakes
 Forney Lake

School districts
 Fremont-Mills Community School District
 Sidney Community School District

Political districts
 Iowa's 3rd congressional district
 State House District 23
 State Senate District 12

References

External links
 City-Data.com

Townships in Iowa
Townships in Fremont County, Iowa